The 2004 Paris Masters (also known as the BNP Paribas Masters for sponsorship reasons) was a men's tennis tournament held at the Palais omnisports de Paris-Bercy in Paris, France and played on indoor carpet courts. It was the 32nd edition of the Paris Masters, and was part of the 2004 ATP Masters Series. The tournament was held from 1 November to 8 November 2004. Russia's Marat Safin defeated Czech Radek Štěpánek in the final to win the singles title, his third at the event after 2000 and 2002.

Finals

Singles

 Marat Safin defeated  Radek Štěpánek, 6–3, 7–6, 6–3

Doubles

 Jonas Björkman /  Todd Woodbridge defeated  Wayne Black /  Kevin Ullyett, 6–3, 6–4

References

External links
 ATP tournament profile

 
BNP Paribas Masters
BNP Paribas Masters